Ali Ibrahim (born 15 February 1971), is a Djiboutian middle-distance athlete.

Competition Results
Ibrahim competed in the 1996 Summer Olympics held in Atlanta, and entered the 1500 metres where he ran into 10th place in his heat thus not qualifying for the next round.

References

1971 births
Living people
Athletes (track and field) at the 1996 Summer Olympics
Olympic athletes of Djibouti
Djiboutian male middle-distance runners